Sinnett may refer to:

Alfred Percy Sinnett (1840–1921), English author and Theosophist
Lawrence C. Sinnett (1888–1962), Seaman in the United States Navy, Medal of Honor recipient
Thomas P. Sinnett (1880–1967), member of the Illinois House of Representatives
Sinnett Octagon House, historic octagonal house in Muscatine, Iowa built in 1855
The Mahatma Letters to A.P. Sinnett, book published in 1923 by A. Trevor Barker

See also
Scinet (disambiguation)
Sennet (disambiguation)
Sennett (disambiguation)
Sinnott